Rodewald is a surname. Notable people with the surname include:

Alfred Edward Rodewald (1862–1903), British musician and merchant
Jack Rodewald (born 1994), Canadian ice hockey player
Marion Rodewald (born 1976), German field hockey player
Nico Rodewald (born 1998), German footballer